Michał Hieronim Bobrzyński (Michael Bobrzynski) (30 September 1849 – 3 July 1935) was a Polish historian and conservative politician.

Life
Bobrzynski was born at Kraków in Galicia.  He was educated there, graduating from the gymnasium and the Jagiellonian University.  In 1872 he received his LL.D. and the following year became assistant professor in the history of Polish jurisprudence, in 1876 assuming similar duties in regard to German law.  In 1877 he became professor of law at the Jagiellonian University.

In 1885–91 he was a member of the Reichsrat and held many other honorary and responsible positions, and in 1890–1901 he was president of the Galician board of education.  He was Governor of Galicia in 1908–13.

His most important publications are his Geschichte Polens (1879), which aroused much criticism on account of its bitter attacks on Poland's past, and his contributions to Lencl's Polnische Rechtsdenkmäler (1874–82).

See also
List of Poles  
Norman Davies, God's Playground: A History of Poland in Two Volumes, Volume 2, p. 116.
  

1849 births
1935 deaths
Politicians from Kraków
People from the Kingdom of Galicia and Lodomeria
Members of the Austrian House of Deputies (1885–1891)
Members of the Austrian House of Deputies (1901–1907)
Members of the House of Lords (Austria)
Governors of the Kingdom of Galicia and Lodomeria
Members of the Diet of Galicia and Lodomeria
Polish male writers
Polish male non-fiction writers
19th-century Polish historians
20th-century Polish historians
Polish conservatives
Jagiellonian University alumni
Members of the Lwów Scientific Society